The 2022 Little League Softball World Series was held in Greenville, North Carolina from August 9 to August 15, 2022.

Teams
Each team that competed in the tournament came out of one of 12 qualifying regions.

Results

Purple Bracket

Winner's Bracket

Elimination Bracket

Orange Bracket

Winner's Bracket

Elimination Bracket

Semifinals & Finals

References

Little League Softball World Series
2022 in softball
2022 in sports in North Carolina
Softball in North Carolina